Manic Expressive is the first full-length album by Her Space Holiday.

Track listing 
 Manic Expressive (Enter)
 Lydia
 The Ringing in My Ears
 Polar Opposite
 Key Stroke
 Spectator Sport
 Hassle Free Harmony
 Perfect on Paper
 Manic Expressive (Exit)

External links 
Her Space Holiday official website
Her Space Holiday on MySpace

Her Space Holiday albums
2001 albums
Wichita Recordings albums